These genera belong to the subfamily Lagriinae, long-jointed beetles.

Lagriinae genera

 Acerogria Borchmann, 1936  (Australasia)
 Acritolagria Borchmann, 1916  (tropical Africa)
 Acropachia Mäklin, 1875  (the Neotropics)
 Acutogria Merkl, 1988  (Australasia)
 Adelium W. Kirby, 1819  (Australasia)
 Adelodemus Haag-Rutenberg, 1878  (Australasia)
 Adelonia Laporte, 1840  (North America and the Neotropics)
 Adelozotypus Kaszab, 1982  (Australasia)
 Adosogria Borchmann, 1936  (tropical Africa)
 Adynata Fåhraeus, 1870  (the Palearctic and tropical Africa)
 Aediatorix Bates, 1868  (Indomalaya)
 Afrolaena Endrödy-Younga & Schawaller, 2002  (tropical Africa)
 Alagria Borchmann, 1916  (tropical Africa)
 Allogria Borchmann, 1916  (tropical Africa)
 Amorphochirus Gebien, 1904  (tropical Africa)
 Anaedus Blanchard, 1842  (North America, the Neotropics, the Palearctic, tropical Africa, and Indomalaya)
 Anisostira Borchmann, 1915  (the Palearctic and Indomalaya)
 Anotoma Borchmann, 1936  (tropical Africa)
 Antennoluprops Schawaller, 2007  (tropical Africa)
 Aoupinia Matthews, 2003  (Australasia)
 Apasis Pascoe, 1869  (Australasia)
 Apocryphodes Matthews, 1998  (Australasia)
 Arcothymus Pascoe, 1866  (Australasia)
 Ardoiniellus Schawaller, 2013  (tropical Africa)
 Arthromacra W. Kirby, 1837  (North America, the Palearctic, and Indomalaya)
 Arunogria Merkl, 1991  (Indomalaya)
 Asiopus Sharp, 1892  (the Neotropics)
 Astatira Borchmann, 1921  (the Neotropics)
 Aulonogria Borchmann, 1929  (Indomalaya)
 Barsenis Pascoe, 1887  (the Neotropics)
 Bellendenum Matthews, 1998  (Australasia)
 Bequaertiella Pic, 1914  (tropical Africa)
 Blepegenes Pascoe, 1868  (Australasia)
 Bluops Carter, 1914  (Australasia)
 Bolitrium Gebien, 1914  (Indomalaya)
 Bolusculus Matthews, 1998  (Australasia)
 Borchmannia Pic, 1912  (Indomalaya)
 Borneolaena Schawaller, 1998  (Indomalaya)
 Bothrichara Borchmann, 1916  (Australasia)
 Bothrionota Borchmann, 1936  (Indomalaya)
 Bothriostira Borchmann, 1936  (tropical Africa)
 Bothynogria Borchmann, 1916  (the Palearctic and Indomalaya)
 Brycopia Pascoe, 1869  (Australasia)
 Calogria Borchmann, 1916  (Australasia)
 Calostegia Westwood, 1843  (tropical Africa)
 Capeluprops Schawaller, 2011  (tropical Africa)
 Cardiothorax Motschulsky, 1860  (Australasia)
 Casnonidea Fairmaire, 1882  (tropical Africa, Indomalaya, and Australasia)
 Catamerus Fairmaire, 1887  (tropical Africa)
 Centorus Mulsant, 1854  (the Palearctic and tropical Africa)
 Ceratoma Borchmann, 1916*
 Cerogria Borchmann, 1911  (the Palearctic, tropical Africa, Indomalaya, and Australasia)
 Cerostira Borchmann, 1942  (tropical Africa)
 Chaerodes White, 1846  (Australasia)
 Chaetyllus Pascoe, 1860  (the Neotropics)
 Chilenolagria Pic, 1936  (the Neotropics)
 Chirocharis Kolbe, 1903  (tropical Africa)
 Chiroscelis Lamarck, 1804  (tropical Africa)
 Chlorophila Semenov, 1891  (the Palearctic and Indomalaya)
 Chrysolagria Seidlitz, 1898  (the Palearctic and tropical Africa)
 Colparthrum Kirsch, 1866  (the Neotropics)
 Coripera Pascoe, 1866  (Australasia)
 Cossyphus G.-A. Olivier, 1791  (the Palearctic, tropical Africa, Indomalaya, and Australasia)
 Costatosora Pic, 1934  (tropical Africa)
 Costiferolagria Pic, 1915  (Indomalaya)
 Coxelinus Fairmaire, 1869  (tropical Africa)
 Ctenogria Borchmann, 1916  (Indomalaya)
 Curtolyprops Pic, 1917  (tropical Africa)
 Cylindrosora Borchmann, 1936  (Indomalaya)
 Cylindrostira Borchmann, 1936  (Indomalaya)
 Cymbeba Pascoe, 1866  (Australasia)
 Daedrosis Bates, 1868  (Australasia)
 Davaona Borchmann, 1930  (Indomalaya)
 Derolagria Borchmann, 1916  (tropical Africa)
 Derostira Fairmaire, 1897  (tropical Africa)
 Diaspirus Matthews, 1998  (Australasia)
 Dichastops Gerstaecker, 1871  (tropical Africa)
 Dicyrtodes Matthews, 1998  (Australasia)
 Diemenoma Matthews, 1998  (Australasia)
 Diorhychina Borchmann, 1936  (tropical Africa)
 Disema Mäklin, 1875  (the Neotropics)
 Disemorpha Pic, 1917  (the Neotropics)
 Donaciolagria Pic, 1914  (the Palearctic and Indomalaya)
 Dorrigonum Matthews, 1998  (Australasia)
 Doyenia Matthews & Lawrence, 2005  (Australasia)
 Dysodera Borchmann, 1936  (tropical Africa)
 Dysopinus Borchmann, 1936  (Indomalaya)
 Eccoptostira Borchmann, 1936  (tropical Africa)
 Ecnocera Borchmann, 1936  (tropical Africa)
 Ecnolagria Borchmann, 1916  (Australasia)
 Emydodes Pascoe, 1860  (the Neotropics)
 Endustomus Brême, 1842  (tropical Africa)
 Enicmosoma Gebien, 1922  (tropical Africa)
 Enigmatica Ferrer, 2005  (tropical Africa)
 Entypodera Gerstaecker, 1871  (tropical Africa)
 Epicydes Champion, 1889  (the Neotropics)
 Epomidus Matthews, 1998  (Australasia)
 Eschatoporis Blaisdell, 1906  (North America)
 Euclarkia Lea, 1919  (Australasia)
 Eulea Carter, 1937  (Australasia)
 Exadelium Watt, 1992  (Australasia)
 Exeniotis Pascoe, 1871  (the Neotropics)
 Exostira Borchmann, 1925  (Indomalaya)
 Falsolagria Pic, 1927  (the Neotropics)
 Falsonemostira Pic, 1917  (Indomalaya)
 Falsotithassa Pic, 1934  (Indomalaya)
 Flabellolagria Pic, 1927  (tropical Africa)
 Gabonisca Fairmaire, 1894  (tropical Africa)
 Gamaxus Bates, 1868  (the Neotropics)
 Gebienia Borchmann, 1921  (the Neotropics)
 Gondvanadelium Kaszab, 1981  (the Neotropics)
 Goniadera Perty, 1832  (the Neotropics)
 Grabulax Kanda, 2016  (the Neotropics)
 Gronophora Borchmann, 1916  (Australasia)
 Helogria Borchmann, 1916  (Indomalaya)
 Hemipristula Bouchard & Bousquet, 2021  (tropical Africa)
 Hosohamudama Masumoto, 1988  (Indomalaya)
 Hovadelium Ardoin, 1962  (tropical Africa)
 Hypolaenopsis Masumoto, 2001  (the Palearctic)
 Hypostatira Fairmaire, 1889  (the Neotropics)
 Hysterarthron J. Thomson, 1864  (Indomalaya)
 Impressosora Pic, 1952  (tropical Africa)
 Indenicmosoma Ardoin, 1964  (the Palearctic and Indomalaya)
 Iscanus Fauvel, 1904  (Australasia and Oceania)
 Isocera Borchmann, 1909  (the Neotropics)
 Isopteron Hope, 1841  (Australasia)
 Kaindilagria Merkl, 1988  (Australasia)
 Kaszabadelium Watt, 1992  (Australasia)
 Kershawia Lea, 1905  (Australasia)
 Kuschelus Kaszab, 1982  (Australasia)
 Laena Dejean, 1821  (the Palearctic and Indomalaya)
 Lagria Fabricius, 1775  (the Neotropics, tropical Africa, Indomalaya, Australasia, and Oceania)
 Lagriodema Borchmann, 1930  (Indomalaya)
 Lagriogonia Fairmaire, 1891  (the Palearctic)
 Lagriomima Pic, 1934  (Indomalaya and Australasia)
 Lagriopsis Borchmann, 1916  (Australasia)
 Lagriostira Fairmaire, 1883  (tropical Africa)
 Leptinostethus Borchmann, 1936  (tropical Africa)
 Leptogastrus W.J. MacLeay, 1872  (Australasia)
 Leptosora Borchmann, 1936  (tropical Africa)
 Licinoma Pascoe, 1869  (the Neotropics and Australasia)
 Lobophilomorphus Pic, 1911  (tropical Africa)
 Lopholagria Borchmann, 1916  (tropical Africa)
 Lophophyllus Fairmaire, 1887  (tropical Africa)
 Lorelus Sharp, 1876  (the Neotropics, Australasia, and Oceania)
 Lorona Borchmann, 1936  (Indomalaya)
 Lucidolaena Endrödy-Younga & Schawaller, 2002  (tropical Africa)
 Luprops Hope, 1833  (the Palearctic, tropical Africa, Indomalaya, and Australasia)
 Lyprochelyda Fairmaire, 1899  (tropical Africa)
 Macrocasnonidea Pic, 1934  (Indomalaya)
 Macrolagria Lewis, 1895  (the Palearctic)
 Malaiseum Borchmann, 1941  (Indomalaya)
 Malayoscelis Schawaller, 2003  (Indomalaya)
 Mallogria Borchmann, 1936  (tropical Africa)
 Meniscophorus Champion, 1889  (the Neotropics)
 Merklia Chen, 1997  (Indomalaya)
 Meropria Borchmann, 1921  (the Neotropics)
 Mesopatrum Broun, 1893  (Australasia)
 Mesotretis Bates, 1872  (Australasia)
 Metallonotus Gray, 1832  (tropical Africa)
 Metriolagria Merkl, 1987  (Australasia)
 Microanaedus Pic, 1923  (tropical Africa)
 Microcalcar Pic, 1925  (tropical Africa)
 Microgoniadera Pic, 1917  (the Neotropics)
 Microlyprops Kaszab, 1939  (Indomalaya)
 Micropedinus Lewis, 1894  (the Palearctic, Indomalaya, and Australasia)
 Mimoborchmania Pic, 1934  (Indomalaya)
 Mimocellus Wasmann, 1904  (tropical Africa)
 Mimolaena Ardoin, 1962  (tropical Africa)
 Mimolagria Pic, 1927  (the Neotropics)
 Mimuroplatopsis Borchmann, 1936  (tropical Africa)
 Minasius Pic, 1932  (the Neotropics)
 Montaguea Kaszab, 1982  (Australasia)
 Monteithium Matthews, 1998  (Australasia)
 Myrmecopeltoides Kaszab, 1973  (the Neotropics)
 Natalostira Pic, 1913  (tropical Africa)
 Neoadelium Carter, 1908  (Australasia)
 Neogria Borchmann, 1911  (Indomalaya)
 Nepalolaena Schawaller, 2001  (Indomalaya)
 Nevermanniella Borchmann, 1936  (the Neotropics)
 Nolicima Matthews, 1998  (Australasia)
 Nothogria Borchmann, 1916  (Australasia)
 Nototrintus Carter, 1924  (Australasia)
 Ocularisora Pic, 1934  (tropical Africa)
 Odontocerostira Merkl, 2007  (the Palearctic and Indomalaya)
 Odontogria Borchmann, 1936  (Indomalaya)
 Oreogria Merkl, 1988  (Australasia)
 Oroptera Borchmann, 1916  (Australasia)
 Othryades Champion, 1889  (the Neotropics)
 Ozotypoides Kaszab, 1982  (Australasia)
 Pachystira Chen, 1997  (Indomalaya)
 Paralorelopsis Marcuzzi, 1994  (the Neotropics)
 Paratenetus Spinola, 1845  (North America and the Neotropics)
 Passalocharis Koch, 1954  (tropical Africa)
 Penadelium Matthews, 1998  (the Neotropics)
 Pengalenganus Pic, 1917  (Indomalaya and Australasia)
 Periatrum Sharp, 1886  (Australasia)
 Pezodontus Dejean, 1834  (tropical Africa)
 Phaedogria Borchmann, 1936  (Indomalaya)
 Pheloneis Pascoe, 1866  (Australasia)
 Pheugonius Fairmaire, 1899  (Indomalaya)
 Phobelius Blanchard, 1842  (the Neotropics)
 Phymatestes Pascoe, 1866  (the Neotropics)
 Physogria Borchmann, 1916  (tropical Africa)
 Physolagria Fairmaire, 1891  (tropical Africa)
 Piciella Borchmann, 1936  (the Neotropics)
 Porrolagria Kolbe, 1883  (tropical Africa)
 Prateus Leconte, 1862  (North America and the Neotropics)
 Prioproctus Kolbe, 1903  (tropical Africa)
 Prioscelides Kolbe, 1889  (tropical Africa)
 Prioscelis Hope, 1841  (tropical Africa)
 Pristophilus Kolbe, 1903  (tropical Africa)
 Prolaena Kaszab, 1980  (Indomalaya)
 Pseudanaedus Gebien, 1921  (tropical Africa)
 Pseudesarcus Champion, 1913  (the Neotropics)
 Pseudeutrapela Pic, 1952  (tropical Africa)
 Pseudobyrsax Kaszab, 1982  (Australasia)
 Pseudocasnonidea Borchmann, 1936  (Indomalaya)
 Pseudocilibe Kaszab, 1982  (Australasia)
 Pseudolagria Champion, 1917  (the Neotropics)
 Pseudolyprops Fairmaire, 1882  (Australasia)
 Pseudopatrum Sharp, 1886  (Australasia)
 Pseudostira Fairmaire, 1903  (tropical Africa)
 Pycnocerus Westwood, 1844  (tropical Africa)
 Rhacolaena Kaszab, 1979  (Indomalaya)
 Rhagostira Borchmann, 1936  (tropical Africa)
 Rhaibodera Borchmann, 1921  (the Neotropics)
 Rhaibogria Borchmann, 1936  (tropical Africa)
 Rhosaces Champion, 1889  (the Neotropics)
 Rhypasma Pascoe, 1862  (the Neotropics)
 Robustosora Pic, 1954  (tropical Africa)
 Rouyerus Pic, 1911  (Indomalaya)
 Ruandania Pic, 1955  (tropical Africa)
 Schevodera Borchmann, 1936  (Indomalaya)
 Schevogria Borchmann, 1936  (tropical Africa)
 Seirotrana Pascoe, 1866  (Australasia)
 Sipolisia Fairmaire, 1889  (the Neotropics)
 Sora Walker, 1859  (the Palearctic, tropical Africa, Indomalaya, and Australasia)
 Sphargeris Pascoe, 1860  (Australasia)
 Sphinctoderus Fairmaire, 1903  (Indomalaya)
 Sphingocorse Gebien, 1921  (tropical Africa and Indomalaya)
 Sphragidophorus Champion, 1889  (the Neotropics)
 Spinadaenus Pic, 1921  (Indomalaya)
 Spinolagriella Pic, 1955  (tropical Africa)
 Spinolyprops Pic, 1917  (the Palearctic, tropical Africa, and Indomalaya)
 Splichalia Reitter, 1913  (the Palearctic)
 Staius Fairmaire, 1896  (tropical Africa)
 Statira Lepeletier & Audinet-Serville, 1828  (North America and the Neotropics)
 Statiropsis Borchmann, 1912  (the Neotropics)
 Stenadelium Watt, 1992  (Australasia)
 Stenolagria Merkl, 1987  (Australasia)
 Stratodemus Gebien, 1921  (tropical Africa)
 Strongylagria Pic, 1915  (the Palearctic)
 Sulcolagria Pic, 1955  (tropical Africa)
 Taiwanolagria Masumoto, 1988  (the Palearctic and Indomalaya)
 Terametus Motschulsky, 1869  (tropical Africa)
 Thoracostira Borchmann, 1936  (the Neotropics)
 Thoseus Pic, 1925  (Indomalaya)
 Tithassa Pascoe, 1860  (the Neotropics)
 Tomogria Merkl, 1988  (Australasia)
 Uroplatopsis Champion, 1889  (the Neotropics)
 Valdivium Matthews, 1998  (the Neotropics)
 Wattadelium Emberson, 2000  (Australasia)
 Xanthalia Fairmaire, 1894  (the Palearctic, tropical Africa, and Indomalaya)
 Xanthicles Champion, 1886  (the Neotropics)
 Xenocerogria Merkl, 2007  (the Palearctic and Indomalaya)
 Xenogena Borchmann, 1936  (tropical Africa)
 Xenolagria Merkl, 1987  (Australasia)
 Xenostethus Bates, 1868  (tropical Africa)
 Yarranum Matthews, 1998  (Australasia)
 Zeadelium Watt, 1992  (Australasia)
 † Gonialaena Nabozhenko, Bukejs & Telnov, 2019
 † Yantaroxenos Nabozhenko, Kirejtshuk & Merkl, 2016

References